Kensei Nakashima (中島 賢星, Nakashima Kensei, born 23 September 1996 in Saga, Japan)  is a Japanese football player who plays as a midfielder for Nara Club.

Club career
On 9 December 2022, Nakashima joined J3 newly promoted, Nara Club for upcoming 2023 season after a season at SC Sagamihara in 2022.

Career statistics
.

References

External links
Profile at FC Gifu
Profile at Yokohama F. Marinos 

 

1996 births
Living people
Association football people from Saga Prefecture
Japanese footballers
J1 League players
J2 League players
J3 League players
Yokohama F. Marinos players
J.League U-22 Selection players
FC Gifu players
SC Sagamihara players
Nara Club players
Association football midfielders